Old Ohavi Zedek Synagogue (Hebrew for "Lovers of Justice") is a historic synagogue building at Archibald and Hyde Streets in Burlington, Vermont.  It was built in 1885 for Ohavi Zedek, Vermont's oldest Jewish congregation, and is currently occupied by Congregation Ahavath Gerim.  The building, a distinctive vernacular interpretation of the Gothic Revival, was listed on the National Register of Historic Places in 1978.

History
 Founded in 1876, Ohavi Zedek is the oldest Jewish congregation in Vermont. The congregation was founded by Jewish immigrants from Eastern Europe, predominantly Lithuanian Jews.  The congregation constructed this building in 1885, and in 1952 the congregation moved to its present home  on North Prospect Street.  This building was sold to Ahavath Gerim, a traditional egalitarian Conservative congregation.

Architecture
The original Ohavi Zedek building stands at the corner of Archibald and Hyde Streets in Burlington's Old North End neighborhood.  It is a rectangular brick building with a gabled roof and Gothic Revival features.  The front facade has arched windows flanking an arched entry, accessed by side-facing stairs.  Above the entrance is a round window with a Star of David.  The building sides also have arched windows, with small oculus windows interspersed above them, which provide illumination for the women's gallery.

The building was erected in 1885, and is among the oldest synagogue buildings still standing in the United States.  Originally finished in wood, it was clad in brick in 1902, when it was enlarged.  It was again enlarged in 1928, at which time the present Torah ark was built.  It has a Classical design, with a depiction of the Ten Commandments flanked by gilded lions and pineapple finials.

See also
Oldest synagogues in the United States
National Register of Historic Places listings in Chittenden County, Vermont

External links
 Ahavath Gerim Synagogue website

References

Lithuanian-Jewish culture in the United States
Properties of religious function on the National Register of Historic Places in Vermont
Synagogues on the National Register of Historic Places
Religious organizations established in 1876
Synagogues completed in 1885
Conservative synagogues in the United States
Synagogues in Vermont
Buildings and structures in Burlington, Vermont
1885 establishments in Vermont
National Register of Historic Places in Burlington, Vermont
1876 establishments in Vermont
Gothic Revival synagogues
Jews and Judaism in Burlington, Vermont